A Shire court, or moot was an Anglo-Saxon legal institution, used to maintain law and order at a local level, and perform various administrative functions, including the collection of taxes for the central government.

The system originated in Wessex, then expanded to other parts of England. Although retained after the 1066 Norman conquest, it gradually lost its power, before the shire courts were formally abolished by the 1846 County Court Act.

Purpose and membership
Headed by an Earl, it was composed of local magnates, both secular and spiritual, who sat in council for the shire; also present was the county sheriff, or shire-reeve, whom, after the conquest, became the king's representative. There-after also it appears courts were headed by the local bishop, who determined the result, while the sheriff ensured it was carried out.  

Most legal issues, including theft or murder, were managed by tithing and hundred courts in the south, or wapentakes in the northern shires. The shire court primarily dealt with civil issues, such as land disputes, and met at least twice a year, acting as a Court of Appeal; an issue had to have been rejected three times by a hundred court before it was passed up to the shire court. 

Using multiple courts often led to arguments over jurisdiction, that delayed legal resolution; in addition to those of the hundreds, these included borough. It was possible for a wealthy and determined individual to delay judgement almost indefinitely, but few were powerful enough to do so regularly. 

The practice originated in Wessex, then gradually expanded into the rest of England; a similar model was used in Wales, particularly after the 1284 Statute of Rhuddlan, although some unique Welsh practices were retained. 

Another important function was collecting taxes for central government. Outside urban areas, Anglo-Saxon England was a non-cash economy, based on barter, or in kind payments. The process monetised taxes paid in goods or food lower down, with the members of the court then responsible for converting it into coin.

Decline and abolishment   

The courts remained in place after the 1066 Norman Conquest, but lost their jurisdiction over the church; in return for Papal support, William the Conqueror established separate Ecclesiastical courts. Over the next century, criminal justice was gradually transferred to the Crown, starting with the Curia regis; by 1278, shire courts only tried civil cases under 40 shillings (2 pounds sterling). They continued in existence until abolished by the 1846 County Courts Act. 

In middle and later mediaeval times the local criminal courts were presided over by a local Justice of the Peace, appointed by the monarch. These developed into magistrates' courts. Higher criminal courts included commissions of trailbaston and forest courts presided over by a Justice in eyre from the time of Henry II. These itinerant justices of the high court travelled around one of six eyres or regional court circuits, and by 1234 under Henry III the system had developed into the Court of King's Bench permanently based in Westminster Hall. Justices of the King's Bench were appointed by letters patent to commissions of gaol delivery and oyer and terminer which sat at assizes; these generally took place in county courts every six months in county towns during the Hilary and Trinity vacations.

See also
Manorial court
Court of piepowders
English criminal law
History of the courts of England and Wales

References

Sources
 
 
 
 
 

Anglo-Saxon law